J. G. Hughes House, also known as Fieldstone, is a historic home located at Columbus, Polk County, North Carolina.  It was built in 1896, and is a two-story, four bay, Queen Anne style frame dwelling.  It has a cross gable roof, is sheathed in weatherboard, and rests on a stone foundation.  It features a wrapround porch with sawn brackets and a cutaway bay window.

It was added to the National Register of Historic Places in 1989.

References

Houses on the National Register of Historic Places in North Carolina
Queen Anne architecture in North Carolina
Houses completed in 1896
Houses in Polk County, North Carolina
National Register of Historic Places in Polk County, North Carolina